The 2021 Indonesian Basketball League (or IBL Pertamax for sponsorship reasons) was the sixth season since the re-branding by Starting5. The regular season began on 10 March 2021 and was ended with the Finals in June 2021. In this season there would be no official preseason tournament and all-star games, while throughout the season would be played inside a bubble in Bogor and Jakarta due to the ongoing COVID-19 pandemic. In addition, every player, staff, and official must follow the strict health protocols implemented by the organizers.

Schedule and location

Homebase

Teams 
Twelve teams competing throughout the season - 8 teams from last season and 2 new teams joined from the expansion process.

New teams 
 Bali United Basketball joined the league after being granted a IBL licence.
 West Bandits Solo also joined the league throughout the expansion process.

Name changes 
 NSH Jakarta would be known as NSH Mountain Gold Timika from the 2021 season after merged with Mountain Gold Basketball Club.
 Louvre Surabaya would be known as Louvre Dewa United Surabaya from the 2021 season after being sponsored.
 Satya Wacana Basketball would be known as Satya Wacana Saints Salatiga from the 2021 season after being sponsored.

Personnel and Kits

Transactions

IBL Draft Local Player

1st round

2nd round

Recommended Player round

Regular season

Table

Red Division

White Division

Results

Play-offs 
The whole playoffs are in a best-of-three series.

First round 
All games held from 23 May until 6 June 2021, in The BritAma Arena, North Jakarta

Red Division

Louvre Dewa United Surabaya vs. Bank BPD DIY Bima Perkasa

White Division

Prawira Bandung vs. West Bandits Solo

Statistics

Individual game highs

Individual statistic

Individual awards 
Most Valuable Player : Jamarr Johnson, (Louvre Surabaya)  

Foreign Player of the Year : None 

Rookie of the Year : Samuel Devin Susanto, (Bank BPD DIY Bima Perkasa) 

Coach of the Year : David Singleton, (Bank BPD DIY Bima Perkasa)  

Defensive Player of the Year : Jamarr Johnson, (Louvre Surabaya)  

Sixthman of the Year : Andre Adriano, (West Bandits Solo) 

Most Improve Player of the Year : Kevin Moses Poetiray, (Louvre Surabaya) 

Most Inspiring Young Player : Yudha Saputera, (Indonesia Patriots) 

Best Referee of the Year : Sedyo Mukti Wibowo 

Best Waterboy of the Year : Kherubine Mercurio 

2021 All-Indonesian First Team

 G: Azzaryan Pradhitya (Bank BPD DIY Bima Perkasa)
 G: Abraham Damar Grahita (Prawira Bandung)
 F: Arki Wisnu (Satria Muda Pertamina Jakarta)
 F: Jamarr Johnson (Louvre Surabaya)
 C: Ponsianus Indrawan (Bali United)

2021 All-Indonesian Second Team

 G: Andakara Prastawa ( Pelita Jaya Bakrie)
 G: Agassi Goantara ( Pelita Jaya Bakrie)
 F: Juan Laurent (Satria Muda Pertamina Jakarta)
 F: Laurentius Oei (Satria Muda Pertamina Jakarta)
 C: Surliyadin (Bali United)

2021 All-Rookie Team 

 G: Yudha Saputera (Prawira Bandung)
 G: Muhammad Arighi ( Pelita Jaya Bakrie)
 F: Ali Bagir Alhadar (Indonesia Patriots)
 F: Aldy Izzatur (Indonesia Patriots)
 C: Kelvin Sanjaya (Satria Muda Pertamina Jakarta)

Finals

Finals MVP

References

External links 

 Official Website

2020–21 in Asian basketball leagues
2020 in Indonesian sport
2021 in Indonesian sport
Basketball in Indonesia
IBL Indonesia